Mick Hogg (28 September 1909 – 14 August 1959) was an Australian cricketer. He played one first-class match for New South Wales in 1928/29.

See also
 List of New South Wales representative cricketers

References

External links
 

1909 births
1959 deaths
Australian cricketers
New South Wales cricketers
People from Goulburn
Cricketers from New South Wales